The Rex Cinema may refer to:
 The Cinema Rex in Abadan, Iran, noted for the 1978 Cinema Rex fire
 Cine Rex, a theatre in Antwerp destroyed by a V-2 rocket attack on 16 December 1944
 The Rex, Berkhamsted, a Grade II listed cinema in Hertfordshire, England, UK

See also
Rex Theatre (disambiguation)
:Category:Cinemas and movie theaters by country